The Death of The Artist is a conceptual and performative work of critical content by artist Abel Azcona. The artwork was both a continuation of his earlier works and closure of the series, being performed in 2018 in the lobby of the Circulo de Bellas Artes in Madrid. His previous works had caused Azcona to receive threats, persecution, and acts of violence. By letter, the artist invited the organizations, groups, and entities that had threatened his life to the installation, where a loaded firearm was offered and Azcona stood exposed on a raised platform.

Persecution and criticism
Abel Azcona has been involved in several controversies and legal proceedings. In his first actions in the streets of Pamplona in 2005, Azcona was arrested several times. Later, during his self-confinement in the work Dark Room, public opinion was against the harshness of his self-imposed deprivation of liberty and food, generating controversy. The work was stopped after 42 days and the artist was admitted to a psychiatric clinic. Similarly, during the installation where another artist stayed continually in a garbage container at the Lyon Biennale, people spoke in favor of ending the work.

The works of Azcona with explicit sexuality such as Empathy and Prostitution or Las Horas, were criticized when shown in cities such as Houston and Mexico City, cities where at the time of the exposition antisodomy or sexual diversity laws existed. In 2012, he was threatened and persecuted for his work Eating a Koran, in which he ingested a copy of the Koran at University of the Arts in Berlin. During the years 2014 and 2015 he was arrested and his exhibitions in the United States were canceled. In 2014, the first Utero performance in Houston was criticized in the media for "exceeding the limits of integrity and endangering his own life". During a Miami exhibition in 2015, twelve children walked into a performance inside the art gallery with firearms in their hands, which was a critique of the laws and the permissibility of weapons in the United States. The exhibition was canceled and Azcona had to return to Europe. A few months later he performed a new work in Chicago, where he denounced the political and ideological nature of Donald Trump. The artistic action was considered "heroic" by the American Huffington Post. In 2015, he was denounced by the Carlist Traditionalist Union for performing the work Buried inside the Monument to the Fallen of Pamplona. The work demanded memory and reparation for the victims of the Republican side. Its exhibition inside the Monument, built in order to exalt Franco, Mola, and Sanjurjo, was considered offensive by far-right conservatives.

Azcona's work denounces child abuse and has been persecuted and denounced for being critical of the Church in works such as The Shadow or Amen or The Pederasty. The latter was sued three times before the Superior Court of Justice of Navarra for desecration and blasphemy by the Archbishopric of Pamplona and Tudela, who are representatives of the Catholic Church in the north of Spain. The second one, by the Delegation of the Government in Navarra, controlled by the Popular Party at the time, and the third one by The Asociación Española de Abogados Cristianos (Spanish Association of Christian Lawyers), who also made criminal complaints against Azcona. The lawsuits were won by Azcona, however the group took the complaint to the Supreme Court. Whilst awaiting the case being heard by the Supreme Court, the Association of Christian Lawyers, in this instance acting alone, started an action against Spain in the European Court of Human Rights in Strasbourg for not condemning Azcona, and according to them, to protect him. Each time the work was shown, the complaint was re-formulated, so Azcona was cited in the Court of Justice of Palma de Mallorca and in the High Court of Justice of Catalonia in Barcelona. After five years of judicial proceedings for critical works against the Catholic Church and more specifically, with pedophilia, Azcona declared his " disobedience" in relation to charges, and the complainants included obstruction of justice in their complaints.

In 2016, Azcona was denounced for exalting terrorism. In his exhibition Still Life, Azcona recreated, in the form of sculptures, performance and hyper-realistic installations, current and historical situations of violence in diverse themes such as historical memory, terrorism and conflict. Two years later, in 2018, he was denounced by the Francisco Franco National Foundation for exposing in one of his works a detonation report, signed by an architect, of the Monument of the Valley of the Fallen. He was also criticized by the State of Israel for the piece The Shame, where the artist installed fragments of the Berlin Wall along the West Bank Wall. The same year he represented Spain at the Asia Art Biennial in Dhaka. Azcona installed wooden chairs in the Pavilion with distressed children from the streets of Dhaka. His performance was interrupted by the protests of the organization and attendees.

Manifest
In addition, the Círculo de Bellas Artes presented a complete reading of The artist's presumption as a radical and disobedient subject, both in life and in death manifesto.

Bibliography

References

Performances